Isoneuromyia is a genus of flies belonging to the family Keroplatidae. The genus has an almost cosmopolitan distribution.

Species
The following species are recognised in the genus Isoneuromyia:
 
Isoneuromyia annandalei 
Isoneuromyia argenteotomentosa 
Isoneuromyia atra 
Isoneuromyia bicingulata 
Isoneuromyia borinqueni 
Isoneuromyia (Platyura) 
Isoneuromyia brunettii 
Isoneuromyia comosa 
Isoneuromyia completa 
Isoneuromyia czernyi 
Isoneuromyia daisenana 
Isoneuromyia elegantissma 
Isoneuromyia elegantula 
Isoneuromyia falcaoi 
Isoneuromyia flava 
Isoneuromyia flavofasciata 
Isoneuromyia forcipata 
Isoneuromyia formosana 
Isoneuromyia glabra 
Isoneuromyia goianensis 
Isoneuromyia grandis 
Isoneuromyia griseofasciata 
Isoneuromyia harrisi 
Isoneuromyia icomi 
Isoneuromyia jata 
Isoneuromyia lenkoi 
Isoneuromyia lopesi 
Isoneuromyia lutea 
Isoneuromyia magna 
Isoneuromyia matilei 
Isoneuromyia mexicanus 
Isoneuromyia mimula 
Isoneuromyia nigerrima 
Isoneuromyia nigribasis 
Isoneuromyia nigrofasciata 
Isoneuromyia novaezelandiae 
Isoneuromyia pallidopsis 
Isoneuromyia palmi 
Isoneuromyia paulistana 
Isoneuromyia polybioides 
Isoneuromyia pulcherrima 
Isoneuromyia ramizi 
Isoneuromyia rufescens 
Isoneuromyia semirufa 
Isoneuromyia sesiformis 
Isoneuromyia singula 
Isoneuromyia sinica 
Isoneuromyia splendida 
Isoneuromyia subapicalis 
Isoneuromyia tannia 
Isoneuromyia timbira 
Isoneuromyia townsendi 
Isoneuromyia tucumana 
Isoneuromyia variabilis 
Isoneuromyia vitripennis 
Isoneuromyia wolongensis 
Isoneuromyia xanthina 
Isoneuromyia xanthocera 
Isoneuromyia yorki 
BOLD:ADS8974 (Isoneuromyia sp.) 
BOLD:ADU4719 (Isoneuromyia sp.)

References

Keroplatidae
Bibionomorpha genera